Inmigrante TV is an American television network featuring political news and commentary aimed at Hispanic immigrants.

The station was founded in 2010 by immigration attorney Manuel Solis. Much of the programming consists of advertising for Solis' law firm.

It was broadcast on the following digital subchannels:
 KAZD 55.3 Dallas – Azteca (Una Vez Mas Holdings, LLC)
 KGBT 4.3 Harlingen, Texas – CBS (Sinclair Broadcast Group)
 KMPX 29.2 Dallas – Estrella TV (Liberman Broadcasting)
 KRCA 62.4 Los Angeles – Estrella TV (Liberman Broadcasting)
 KTAZ 39.2 Phoenix – Telemundo (NBC Universal)
 KTDO 47.3 El Paso – Telemundo (ZGS Communications)
 KZJL 61.2 Houston – Estrella TV (Liberman Broadcasting)
 WESV-LD 40.2 Chicago – Independent

References 
 Nation's First Immigration TV Network Launches in Houston

Spanish-language television networks in the United States
Television channels and stations established in 2010